Davis Strait  is a northern arm of the Atlantic Ocean that lies north of the Labrador Sea. It lies between mid-western Greenland and Baffin Island in Nunavut, Canada. To the north is Baffin Bay. The strait was named for the English explorer John Davis (1550–1605), who explored the area while seeking a Northwest Passage. By the 1650s it was used for whale hunting.

Extent
The International Hydrographic Organization defines the limits of the Davis Strait as follows:
On the North. The Southern limit of Baffin Bay [The parallel of 70° North between Greenland and Baffin Land].

On the East. The Southwest coast of Greenland.

On the South. The parallel of 60° North between Greenland and Labrador.

On the West. The Eastern limit of the Northwestern Passages South of 70° North [the East coast of Baffin Island to East Bluff, its Southeastern extremity] and of Hudson Strait [A line from East Bluff, the Southeast extreme of Baffin Island, to Point Meridian, the Western extreme of Lower Savage Islands, along the coast to its Southwestern extreme and thence a line across to the Western extreme of Resolution Island, through its Southwestern shore to Hatton Headland, its Southern point, thence a line to Cape Chidley, Labrador].

Geology

The Davis Strait is underlain by complex geological features of buried grabens (basins) and ridges, formed by strike-slip faulting of the Ungava Fault Zone during Paleogene times about 45 million to 62 million years ago. The strike-slip faulting transferred plate-tectonic motions in the Labrador Sea to Baffin Bay. It is the world's broadest strait.

Depth
With a water depth of between one and two thousand meters the strait is substantially shallower than the Labrador Sea to the south.

Tides

Oil and gas 

US Geological Survey has estimated that at least 13% of the world's undiscovered oil deposits and 30% of the world's undiscovered gas pockets are located in the Arctic, with the seas around Greenland potentially holding large amounts of natural gas and lesser amounts of crude oil and natural gas liquids. This has led Greenland's minister and provincial council to offer a large number of off-shore concessions to potential hydrocarbon (oil and gas) extraction. The largest concessions areas are located in seas west of Greenland, primarily the Davis Strait and Baffin Bay, but with several smaller concessions in the Greenland Sea in the east also.

References

Further reading

 Boertmann, David. Mapping of Oil Spill Sensitive Areas in the Davis Strait, West Greenland A Review of Biological Data in Relation to Oil Spill Sensitivity Mapping, with an Identification of Data Gaps. Copenhagen, Denmark: Greenland Environmental Research Institute, 1992.
 Crawford, R. E. Life History of the Davis Strait Greenland Halibut, with Reference to the Cumberland Sound Fishery. Winnipeg: Dept. of Fisheries and Oceans, 1992.
 
 
 
 
 
 Ross, W. Gillies. Arctic Whalers, Icy Seas Narratives of the Davis Strait Whale Fishery. Toronto, Canada: Irwin Pub, 1985.

External links 
June 2005 satellite photograph of Davis Strait from MODIS, showing meltwater ponds

 
Bodies of water of Baffin Island
Canada–Greenland border
International straits
Straits of Canada
Straits of Greenland
Straits of Qikiqtaaluk Region
Seas of Canada
Seas of Greenland
Geography of North America